Wellington railway station is a railway station in New Zealand.

Wellington station may also refer to:
 Wellington railway station (Shropshire) in Telford, Shropshire, England
 Wellington railway station (Somerset) in Wellington, Somerset, England (closed)
 Wellington railway station (South Africa) in Wellington, Western Cape, South Africa
Wellington railway station (Tamil Nadu) in India
 Wellington station (CTA) on the Brown Line in Chicago, Illinois, United States
 Wellington (MBTA station) in Medford, Massachusetts, United States
 Wellington station (British Columbia) in Nanaimo, British Columbia, Canada
 Wellington railway station, New South Wales in New South Wales, Australia